Johannes Bernardus "Joop" Odenthal (13 March 1924 – 19 January 2005) was a Dutch footballer, baseball player and football manager. He competed in the men's tournament at the 1952 Summer Olympics,  representing the Netherlands.

Career

Baseball
Odenthal was a well-known athlete. He played as a baseball player between 1946 and 1954, at former Haarlem Hoofdklasse club EDO where he was a shortstop and third baseman. In 1948 and 1949 he appeared twice for the Netherlands national baseball team during the international matches against Belgium.

Football
As a footballer, Odenthal played for EDO, Haarlem, SC Enschede and Tubantia respectively. Born in Haarlem, his move from EDO to in-city rivals HFC Haarlem was hugely unpopular among fans. After a move to Enschede, he continued his football career with the two main Hoofdklasse clubs from that city. Between 1951 and 1956, he made 24 appearances for the Netherlands national team. He made his international debut against Finland in 1951. After his active sports career, Odenthal for a long time coached both baseball players and footballers at Achilles '12 in Hengelo. He also coached the senior team of Quick '20. Odenthal, together with Henk Schijvenaar and Cor Wilders, remains one of the only athletes competing for both the Netherlands football team and baseball team.

Personal life
He is the grandfather of Cas Odenthal, who plays as a footballer for NEC Nijmegen.

References

External links
 

1924 births
2005 deaths
Dutch footballers
Netherlands international footballers
Olympic footballers of the Netherlands
Footballers at the 1952 Summer Olympics
Footballers from Haarlem
Association football defenders
Dutch football managers
Dutch baseball players
Baseball shortstops
Baseball third basemen
HFC EDO players
HFC Haarlem players
Sportclub Enschede players